Waldemar Font Quintero is a Cuban former amateur boxer who won the World Amateur Championships as a flyweight at Tampere in 1993.

While competing at the 1994 Goodwill Games, Font tested positive for the banned diuretic furosemide and had to forfeit the flyweight gold medal that he won there, in addition to receiving a two-year ban.

Font had a successful return to boxing, winning a silver medal at the 1997 World Amateur Boxing Championships, as a bantamweight. He was a gold medalist at the 1998 Central American and Caribbean Games, silver medalist at the 1998 Goodwill Games and bronze medalist at the 1999 Pan American Games.

References

External links 

Year of birth missing (living people)
Living people
Cuban male boxers
Bantamweight boxers
Flyweight boxers
AIBA World Boxing Championships medalists
Pan American Games medalists in boxing
Pan American Games bronze medalists for Cuba
Boxers at the 1999 Pan American Games
Central American and Caribbean Games gold medalists for Cuba
Competitors at the 1998 Central American and Caribbean Games
Goodwill Games medalists in boxing
Cuban sportspeople in doping cases
Doping cases in boxing
Boxers from Havana
Central American and Caribbean Games medalists in boxing
Competitors at the 1994 Goodwill Games
Medalists at the 1999 Pan American Games
20th-century Cuban people